Spendere Meglio (English:  Spend Better) is a Swiss Italian-language consumer magazine, published in Bellinzona, Ticino.

Founded by the journalist Matteo Cheda in February 1996, the magazine's circulation was 12,000 in 2016.

See also

 List of magazines in Switzerland

References

External links 
 Official Website

1996 establishments in Switzerland
Consumer magazines
Culture in Ticino
Italian-language magazines
Magazines established in 1996
Magazines published in Switzerland